Saanich North and the Islands is a provincial electoral district for the Legislative Assembly of British Columbia, Canada.  It is located in the northern suburbs of the provincial capital, Victoria, and includes the southern Gulf Islands.

Saanich North and the Islands was created by 1990 legislation dividing the previous two-member district of Saanich and the Islands which came into effect for the 1991 B.C. election.

In 2017 Adam Olsen was elected MLA for the Green Party of BC and in 2020 Olsen defeated NDP Zeb King.

Demographics

Geography 
Saanich North and the Islands consists of the Southern Gulf Islands as well as the municipalities of North Saanich, Central Saanich, and Sidney on Vancouver Island.

History

Members of Legislative Assembly 
Over the district's existence, it elected the following members of the Legislative Assembly of British Columbia:

Election results

External links 
BC Stats Profile - 2001
Results of 2001 election (pdf)
2001 Expenditures
Results of 1996 election
1996 Expenditures
Results of 1991 election
1991 Expenditures
Website of the Legislative Assembly of British Columbia
Riding Map (pdf)

References

British Columbia provincial electoral districts on Vancouver Island